The World Administrative Radio Conference (WARC) was a 1979 technical conference of the International Telecommunication Union (ITU) where delegates from member nations of the ITU met to revise or amend the entire international radio regulations pertaining to all telecommunication services throughout the world. The conference was held in Geneva, Switzerland, with preparatory conferences held in Panama City, Panama.

One outcome of the 1979 meeting was the allocation of three new amateur radio bands.

In 1992, at an Additional Plenipotentiary Conference in Geneva, the ITU was restructured and as a result from 1993 the conference became known as the World Radiocommunication Conference or WRC.

Conferences list

ITU Preparatory to World Administrative Radio Conference Panama 1979
ITU World Administrative Radio Conference Geneva 1979 (WARC-79)
ITU World Administrative Radio Conference Geneva 1984 (WARC-84)
ITU World Administrative Radio Conference Geneva 1992 (WARC-92)

See also
Amateur radio
Radio
Telecommunications

References

Telecommunication conferences
International broadcasting
Recurring events disestablished in 1992
1992 disestablishments